Trąbki  is a village in Wieliczka County, Lesser Poland Voivodeship, in southern Poland. It is the seat of the gmina (administrative district) called Gmina Biskupice.

References

Villages in Wieliczka County